Karen TenEyck (1958) is an American scenic and graphic designer who has worked in theatre, opera, film, and TV.

Early life and education
TenEyck was raised in Wilmington, Delaware. She attended Kutztown State College in Pennsylvania and earned a degree in advertising and graphic design.

Career 

After graduation TenEyck worked for various advertising companies. She attended the Yale School of Drama and graduated in 1991. She then worked in the field of advertising and later moved to New York City. In 2013 she lived in California.

Scene design 
TenEyck designed sets for theatrical productions for eleven years. Her style is generally spare and simple, but not to the point of abstraction. Some of her sets are more intricate, such as her design for Richard Greenberg's adaptation of Triumph of Love.

In addition to physical scene design, TenEyck has also developed techniques in virtual projection design while working for the Mabou Mines theatre company. She used these techniques on the Shakespeare Festival of LA's rendition of Julius Caesar, where modern-esque campaign projections for Caesar were displayed against the backdrop of Los Angeles City Hall. Both her work at Mabou Mines and Los Angeles won her awards for digital/graphic work.

Film 
After working in theatre for 11 years, TenEyck did graphic work for the film Anger Management, and since then has worked on more than 30 other film titles. Some of her more recent film projects include graphics and branding for Water for Elephants, Captain America: The First Avenger, and Lincoln.

Awards 

 American Theatre Wing award for Special Effects
 An Epidog ToRoNaDa Studio, New York NY 1996
 Drama Logue Award for Scenic Design
 The Triumph of Love South Coast Repertory, Costa Mesa California 1997
 Pygmalion South Coast Repertory, Costa Mesa California 1997
 Garland Award for Set Design
 Julius Caesar, Los Angeles City Hall, Los Angeles, California, 1998
 Included in the Autry Museum of Western Heritage's exhibition on Chinese-American life since the 1790s
 On Gold Mountain, Irvine Barclay Theatre, Irvine California 2000

References

External links 
 
 

1958 births
Living people
American people of Dutch descent
American scenic designers
Women scenic designers
People from Wilmington, Delaware
Kutztown University of Pennsylvania alumni
Yale School of Drama alumni